The 49th British Academy Film Awards, given by the British Academy of Film and Television Arts on 23 April 1996, honoured the best films of 1995.

Ang Lee's Sense and Sensibility won the award for Best Film. The film also won awards for Best Actress (Emma Thompson) and Supporting Actress (Kate Winslet). Il postino (The Postman), directed by Michael Radford, won the awards for Best Director, Film Not in the English Language, and Original Music. Nigel Hawthorne won Best Actor in a Leading Role for his performance in The Madness of King George; the same film was voted Outstanding British Film of the Year. Additionally, Tim Roth won the award for Best Supporting Actor for his role as Archibald Cunningham in Rob Roy.

Winners and nominees

Statistics

See also
 68th Academy Awards
 21st César Awards
 1st Critics' Choice Awards
 48th Directors Guild of America Awards
 9th European Film Awards
 53rd Golden Globe Awards
 7th Golden Laurel Awards
 16th Golden Raspberry Awards
 10th Goya Awards
 11th Independent Spirit Awards
 1st Lumières Awards
 22nd Saturn Awards
 2nd Screen Actors Guild Awards
 48th Writers Guild of America Awards

References
 
 
 
 
 

Film049
B
1996 in British cinema
April 1996 events in the United Kingdom
1996 in London
1995 awards in the United Kingdom